Shvakino is a rural locality (a settlement) in Obozerskoye Rural Settlement of Plesetsky District, Arkhangelsk Oblast, Russia. The population was 105 as of 2010. There are 2 streets.

Geography 
Shvakino is located 132 km north of Plesetsk (the district's administrative centre) by road. Uromets is the nearest rural locality.

References 

Rural localities in Plesetsky District